Bernard Jay Nedell (October 14, 1898 – November 23, 1972) was an American film actor. He appeared in 50 films between 1916 and 1972. He was born in New York, New York and died in Hollywood, California. He was married to actress Olive Blakeney.

In the early 1920s, Nedell acted with the T. Daniel Frawley Company.

Selected filmography

 Bachelor Apartments (1921) - Janitor
 A Knight in London (1928) - Prince Zalnoff
 The Silver King (1929) - Capt. 'Spider' Skinner
 The Return of the Rat (1929) - Henri de Verrat
 The Man from Chicago (1930) - Nick Dugan
 Call of the Sea (1930) - Ramon Tares
 Shadows (1931) - Press Rawlinson
 The Innocents of Chicago (1932) - Tony Costello
 Her Imaginary Lover (1933) - Davidson
 The Girl in Possession (1934) - De Courville
 Lazybones (1935) - Michael McCarthy
 Heat Wave (1935) - Gen. Da Costa
 The First Offence (1936) - The Boss
 The Live Wire (1937) - James Cody
 Oh Boy! (1938) - Angelo Tonelli
 Mr. Moto's Gamble (1938) - Clipper McCoy
 Exposed (1938) - Mike Romero
 Secret Service of the Air (1939) - Earl 'Ace' Hemrich
 Lucky Night (1939) - 'Dusty' Sawyer
 Some Like It Hot (1939) - Stephen Hanratty
 They All Come Out (1939) - Clyde Madigan - 'Reno'
 The Angels Wash Their Faces (1939) - Krammer
 Those High Grey Walls (1939) - Redlands
 Fast and Furious (1939) - Ed Connors
 Slightly Honorable (1939) - Pete Godena
 Strange Cargo (1940) - Marfeu
 Rangers of Fortune (1940) - Tod Shelby
 So You Won't Talk (1940) - Bugs Linaker
 Ziegfeld Girl (1941) - Nick Capalini
 Ship Ahoy (1942) - Pietro Polesi
 The Desperadoes (1943) - Jack Lester
 Northern Pursuit (1943) - Tom Dagor
 Maisie Goes to Reno (1944) - J.E. Clave
 One Body Too Many (1944) - Morton Gellman - Attorney
 Allotment Wives (1945) - Spike Malone
 Crime Doctor's Man Hunt (1946) - Waldo
 The Lone Wolf in Mexico (1947) - Leon Dumont
 Monsieur Verdoux (1947) - Prefect of Police
 Albuquerque (1948) - Sheriff Ed Linton
 The Loves of Carmen (1948) - Pablo
 Hickey & Boggs (1972) - Used Car Salesman

References

External links

1898 births
1972 deaths
American male film actors
American male stage actors
Male actors from New York (state)
20th-century American male actors